Mofongo is a Puerto Rican dish with plantains as its main ingredient. Plantains are picked green, cut into pieces and typically fried but can be boiled or roasted, then mashed with salt, garlic, broth, and olive oil in a wooden pilón (mortar and pestle).  The goal is to produce a tight ball of mashed plantains that will absorb the attending condiments and have either pork cracklings (chicharrón) or bits of bacon inside. It is traditionally served with fried meat and chicken broth soup. Particular flavors result from variations that include vegetables, chicken, shrimp, beef, or octopus packed inside or around the plantain orb.

Origin and history
Mofongo's distant roots lead to the African fufu, mixed with major Spanish and Taíno influences. Fufu is made from various starchy vegetables and was introduced to the Caribbean by Africans in the Spanish New World colonies such as Cuba (fufu de plátano and machuquillo), Dominican Republic (mangú), Haiti (Tom Tom) and Puerto Rico (mofongo and funche criollo); this also most likely includes Colombia (cayeye),   Ecuador (bolón), Costa Rica (angú), Amazon region and Peru (tacacho).

The earliest known written recipes for mofongo appeared in Puerto Rico's first cookbook, El Cocinero Puerto-Riqueño o Formulario, in 1859. The title of the recipe is mofongo criollo. Green plantains are cleaned with lemon, boiled with veal and hen, then mashed with garlic, oregano brujo, ají dulce, bacon or lard, and ham. It is then formed into a ball and eaten with the broth which it was cooked in.

In El Cocinero Puerto-Riqueño o Formulario there are similar recipes. Funche criollo is made from green or yellow plantains boiled with taro or yams, mashed and eaten with sesame broth soup or a sauce made from garlic, lard, tomato sauce, onions, and ají dulce (sofrito).

The second recipe was written in 1948 by Elizabeth B.K. Dooley in Puerto Rican cookbook. The recipe calls for yellow plantains fried in lard, mashed with garlic, olive oil, chicarrón and formed into a ball. 

The recipe has been frequently changed throughout Puerto Rico but maintained key ingredients such as fat, pork, starch, spices, broth, and a pilón for mashing. A 1980 booklet from the U.S. government promoting tourism in Puerto Rico wrote of mofongo as being "jocularly described as a Puerto Rican matzoh ball" and described mofongo as being a "mashed, roasted plantain, combine with bacon, spices and goes well with chicken soup.El Cocinero Puerto-Riqueño o Formulario also has an example of green plantains roasted over coal and eaten with fat and garlic called plátanos asado.

Etymology
Central African ethnic groups that populated Puerto Rico used the technique of a mallet to mash large amounts of starchy foods. The mash was then softened with liquids and fats. The word “mofongo” stems from the Kikongo term mfwenge-mfwenge, which means “a great amount of anything at all".

Culture
Mofongo evolved from 3 cultural influences Spanish, Taino and African within the Puerto Rican populace, Though Mofongo is very different to fufu but using the African method with vegetation available in the Caribbean. Plantains are most often used, but other starchy roots native to the island used by Taínos can also be used. Puerto Ricans have an obsession with fried food known collectively as cuchifrito in New York City. Spanish ingredients such as pork, garlic, broth, and olive oil are commonly used together in Puerto Rican cuisine and are found in staple dishes such as arroz con gandules, alcapurria, pasteles, habichuelas, recaíto, and arroz junto, among others. Broth is often made with chicken and sofrito. Sofrito is made with Spanish and Taíno fruits, vegetables, and herbs.

Pork is a major component for most traditional offerings and the preparations of Puerto Rican cuisine. The only other Caribbean island where pork is a major component is Cuba. The use of lard, pork scraps and inner parts has its influence from the harsh diet and treatment of African people in Puerto Rico. This led to dish on the island such as mofongo, gandinga, and mondongo. Mofongo combines the African tradition of fufu with limited ingredients given to slaves plantains, lard, and pork scraps.

Food trucks
Food trucks around Puerto Rico, Florida, New York, and other parts of the USA serve mofongo as a fast food available in food trucks. A popular version in Puerto Rico is papas locas, crazy fries. Mofongo is placed flat in a takeaway container layered with French fries or yam fries, shredded meat or meats, chopped onions, avocado, tomatoes, cilantro, lettuces, corn, melted cheese, and mayoketchup (fry sauce).

Method

The name mofongo refers to cooked plantains mashed with fat (olive oil, lard, or butter), spices, and pork in a wooden mortar and pestle called a pilón (made with mahogany or guaiacum, both native hardwoods) and shaped more or less into a ball and served with broth. The mofongo is then able to absorb any juice or broth from the seared meat that is placed on top or inside of the dish. The consistency of mofongo is much more dense and stiff than fufu.

Variations

It is also common in Puerto Rico to make mofongo with cassava (mofongo de yuca), breadfruit (mofongo de pana), and ripe plantain mofongo (mofongo de amarillo). 

The bifongo is any combination of two starches fried and mashed together. 
Ripe and green plantains together is the most popular choice. 

The trifongo is any combination of three starches fried and mashed together. Most popular is cassava with green and ripe plantains, but batata and breadfruit may be used.

Mofongo stuffed with shrimp (camarón in Spanish) is called camarofongo.

Thanksgiving is an American holiday that has been adopted by Puerto Rico and Puerto Ricans outside the commonwealth. Turkey is the main focus on every Thanksgiving table and is traditionally stuffed with bread. The bread stuffing can be mixed with mofongo or replaced entirely with mofongo. The dish is called pavochon.

Frito-Lay produces MoFongo Snax, combining plantain chips, cassava chips and pork rinds into one bag.

Mofongo relleno is a stuffed variation of mofongo, which, according to Yvonne Ortiz, was first made in "Tino's Restaurant on the west coast of Puerto Rico" when seafood, abundant in the region, was placed inside the plantain ball with braised meat or more seafood poured over it. Today, mofongo relleno is commonly stuffed with either seafood, poultry, or another meat.

Moca, Dominican Republic is known for making a mofongo with cheddar cheese shredded on top. It has been called mofongo Dominicano and mofongo el Mocano.

Outside Puerto Rico
Dominicans who feared the dictatorship of Rafael Trujillo fled to Puerto Rico and New York City. Mofongo caught on quickly with Dominicans living in Puerto Rico and New York City. After Trujillo's death many Dominicans returned to the Dominican Republic, bringing the recipe for mofongo, which has remained popular ever since. The first Dominican cookbook with a recipe for mofongo is Cocina Criolla, second edition by Amanda Ornes, in 1962. The recipe is called "mafongo" using roasted green plantains mashed with just chicarrón and oil. Ramona Hernández, director of the Dominican Studies Institute of the City University of New York, has said, "mofongo is a dish borrowed from Puerto Rico that has much success with Dominicans". Dominican chef Clara Gonzalez, also known as Aunt Clara, says in her cookbook, "mofongo has a special place in the Dominicans' hearts and stomachs but can be traced back to Puerto Rico". 

Mofongo has become popular among Colombians, Cubans and Dominicans living in the United States and anywhere large numbers of Puerto Ricans or Dominicans reside.

In popular culture
Food Network chef and host Guy Fieri featured mofongo from Benny's Seafood (in Miami, Florida) and from El Bohio (in San Antonio, Texas) on two separate episodes of his show Diners, Drive-Ins and Dives. He liked the dish so much that he called it the "best fried thing I ever ate" on an episode of the show The Best Thing I Ever Ate.

An episode of the Travel Channel's Man v. Food Nation, set in Harlem, showed the host Adam Richman visiting a Spanish Harlem restaurant called La Fonda Boricua, where they make a giant 12-plantain mofongo called the Mofongaso.

Perhaps the oldest song mentioning mofongo is called "Puertorriqueño" by Joe Valle and César Concepción.

On Saturday Night Live, David Ortiz (a recurring impression played by Kenan Thompson) frequently refers to the dish when describing his "big lunch".

Mofongo was mentioned numerous times on the 1970s U.S. NBC situation comedy Sanford & Son when characters Fred and Lamont (Redd Foxx and Demond Wilson) interact with their Puerto Rican neighbor Julio (Gregory Sierra).

The 2021 animated PBS show Alma's Way, about a Puerto Rican girl growing up in the Bronx with her family, frequently mentions mofongo as a favorite family dish.

References

External links
 Mofongo with Pork Rind & Bacon [Spanish]
 Mofongo recipe 2
 Mofongo recipe
 Mofongo de Yuca
 Mofongo de Pana (Breadfruit)

Puerto Rican cuisine
Caribbean cuisine
Latin American cuisine
Plantain dishes
Puerto Rican fusion cuisine